Penicillium minioluteum is an anamorph species of the genus Penicillium which produces dextranase, miniolin A, miniolin B and miniolin C.

References

Further reading 

 
 
 
 
 
 
 
 
 
 

minioluteum
Fungi described in 1901